A lattice tower or truss tower is a freestanding vertical framework tower. This construction is widely used in transmission towers carrying high voltage electric power lines, in radio masts and towers (a self-radiating tower or as a support for aerials) and in observation towers. Its advantage is good shear strength at a much lower weight than a tower of solid construction would have as well as lower wind resistance. In structural engineering the term lattice tower is used for a freestanding structure, while a lattice mast is a guyed mast supported by guy lines. Lattices of triangular (3-sided) cross-section are most common, particularly in North America. Square (4-sided) lattices are also widely used and are most common in Eurasia. Lattice towers are often designed as either a space frame or a hyperboloid structure.

Before 1940, they were used as radio transmission towers especially for short and medium wave. Occasionally lattice towers consisting of wood were utilized. The tallest wooden lattice tower was at Mühlacker, Germany. Most wood lattice towers were demolished before 1960. In Germany, the last big radio towers consisting of wood were the transmission towers of the Golm transmitter and the transmitter Ismaning. They were demolished in 1979 and 1983 respectively.

The city most renowned for lattice towers is Cincinnati, Ohio, which features four towers above 900 feet in height. Tokyo is the only other city in the world that has more than one above that height.

The majority of the tallest steel lattice towers in the world are actually built in water and used as oil platforms. These structures are usually built in large pieces on land, most commonly in Texas or Louisiana, and then moved by barge to their final resting place. Since a large portion of these towers is underwater the official height of such structures is often held in dispute. The steel lattice truss for these structures, known as jackets in the oil industry, are typically far more robust and reinforced than their land-based counterparts, sometimes weighing more than 50,000 tons as is the case for the Bullwinkle and Baldpate platforms, whereas tall (above 1,000 feet) land-based lattice towers range from a high of 10,000 tons as is the case in the Eiffel Tower to as low as a few hundred tons. They are built to a higher standard to support the weight of the oil platforms built on top of them and because of the forces to which they are subjected. As a result, the cost to build these structures can run into the hundreds of millions. These costs are justified due to the resulting oil and gas revenues, whereas land-based towers have a much lower stream of revenue and therefore the capital costs of towers are typically much less.

Timeline of world's tallest lattice tower 
Since end of the 19th century, tall lattice towers were built. Lattice towers have even held the absolute height record. They are among the tallest free-standing architectural structures and hold a number of national records, such as the tallest free-standing or even overall tallest structure of a country.

Land record, iron and steel towers

Land record, wood towers

Land & water record, overall

Steel lattice towers

Tallest lattice towers, all types 
List of all supertall lattice tower structures in the world.

Lattice towers with observation decks 
 indicates a structure that is no longer standing.

Radio tower carrying aerials 
List of radio tower above 150 m / 500 ft in height.

 indicates a structure that is no longer standing.
 indicates a structure that has had a change in height or has been rebuilt.

Electrical Pylons 
List of Electrical pylons above 150 m / 500 ft in height.

Wind turbines 

Tall wind turbines supported by lattice tallest have been built almost exclusively in Germany, one of the first countries in the world to build wide spread renewable power resources. The total height includes the lattice tower and the wind turbine rotor at peak height.

List of wind turbines with a lattice tower above 150 m / 500 ft in height.

Chimneys/Smokestacks 

The majority of tall lattice chimneys in the world are located in Japan. Unlike other modern developed countries which use reinforced concrete to build tall chimneys Japan has historically used steel until recently for chimney construction.

List of lattice stacks above 150 m/492 ft in height. 
 indicates a structure that is no longer standing.

Oil Platforms 
List of oil platforms with a steel jacket above 300 m / 1000 ft in height.

Jackup Rigs 
List of jackup rigs above  in height.

Pillars of aerial tramways

Rides 
List of amusement park rides that make use of a steel lattice tower above 100 m / 328 ft in height.

Monuments

Lighthouses

Other uses

Wooden lattice towers

Existing towers

Destroyed Wooden lattice towers

Tallest lattice towers, by design type 

List of the tallest lattice towers by common(min 5) design types.

Unique lattice tower designs. Minimum height of 120 m / 400 ft. 
 indicates a structure that is no longer standing.

Hyperboloid structures

Landmark towers

Blaw-Know towers

Top guyed lattice towers

See also 
 List of towers
 List of tallest towers
 List of tallest structures
 List of tallest freestanding steel structures
 List of tallest buildings and structures
 List of tallest oil platforms
 Architectural structure
 Hyperboloid structure
 Partially guyed tower
 Additionally guyed tower

References 

Towers